Acheng District (Manchu Language: Alcuka Hoton) is one of nine districts of the prefecture-level city of Harbin, the capital of Heilongjiang Province, Northeast China, covering part of the southeastern suburbs. The district was approved to establish from the former Acheng City by the Chinese State Council on August 15, 2006. It lies within the basin of and until 1909 was considered synonymous with the Ashi River which gave its name to the Jurchen Jin Dynasty. The district administers nine subdistricts, eight towns, one township, and one ethnic township. It borders Daowai District to the north, Bin County to the northeast, Shangzhi to the southeast, and Wuchang to the south, Shuangcheng District to the west, and Pingfang and Xiangfang Districts to the northwest.

History
Acheng was known to medieval China as Huining Prefecture, an area of Shangjing. Its eponymous seat served as the first capital of the Jurchen Jin Dynasty (1122–1234) and served as a subsidiary capital from 1173 until their conquest by the Mongolian Empire.

Acheng County was established in 1909. It was designated a county-level city in 1987 and turned into a district of Harbin on October 9, 2006.

Climate

Population

Administrative divisions
Acheng is divided into fifteen subdistricts and four towns: 

Subdistricts:
Jincheng Subdistrict, Jindou Subdistrict, Tongcheng Subdistrict, Hedong Subdistrict, Ashenhe Subdistrict, Sheli Subdistrict, Xinli Subdistrict, Shuangfeng Subdistrict, Yuquan Subdistrict, Xiaoling Subdistrict, Yagou Subdistrict, Jiaojie Subdistrict, Liaodian Subdistrict, Feiketu Subdistrict, Yangshu Subdistrict

Towns:
 Pingshan, Songfengshan, Hongxing, Jinlongshan

Commerce
The area is rich in mineral resources, including sources of rock, volcanic rock, granite, molybdenum, zinc, lead, iron, and copper.

The agricultural strengths of the area are grain production and cattle. Grain production is strong, having produced 33,100 tons of grain in 2002; much of this grain is essential in feeding the important city of Harbin.

Acheng is a major industrial area for Heilongjiang, with over 300 types of enterprises, including textile, electromechanics, food, building materials (especially brickworks), metallurgy, breweries fueled by the local grain, sugar refineries, a flax plant, iron, steel, and the production of medicine. In 1996 a new technology industrial development zone was created on the western side of the city to encourage the development of high technology, export-oriented industry.

Tourism is also a growing part of the local economy. Acheng is located on the popular tourist route serving Harbin, the Yabuli Ski Resort, Jingpo Lake, and Xingkai Lake. A number of historic and nature reserves in the area also attract visitors.

Transport
Acheng District is a  drive from Harbin Taiping International Airport.

The Harbin–Suifenhe Railway (part of the original Chinese Eastern Railway) passes through the district. There are over twenty commuter rail lines in the rural area. The station is Acheng Railway Station.

G10 Suifenhe–Manzhouli Expressway and China National Highway 301 both connect the district to downtown Harbin.

People of note
 Huang Taihua: artist born in Acheng (1947), director of the Academy of Fine Arts of Acheng, director of the Heilongjiang Artists Association.
 Zhao Weichen: President of China Unicom, born in Acheng (1929)

Notes

References

Citations

Bibliography

External links

 Official website of Acheng District Government

Cities in Heilongjiang
Districts of Harbin